Group A of the 2008 Fed Cup Europe/Africa Zone Group III was one of two pools in the Europe/Africa zone of the 2008 Fed Cup. Five teams competed in a round-robin competition, with the top team advancing to Group I for 2009.

Latvia vs. Zimbabwe

Norway vs. Mauritius

Norway vs. Zimbabwe

Mauritius vs. Iceland

Latvia vs. Iceland

Mauritius vs. Zimbabwe

Latvia vs. Norway

Iceland vs. Zimbabwe

Latvia vs. Mauritius

Norway vs. Iceland 

  placed first in this group and thus advanced to Group II for 2009. They placed first in their pool of three and also won their promotion play-off match, meaning they achieved promotion to Group I for 2010.

References

External links 
 Fed Cup website

2008 Fed Cup Europe/Africa Zone